The Khangai Mountains; form a range in central Mongolia, some  west of Ulaanbaatar.

Name

Two provinces of Mongolia are named after the Khangai mountains: Arkhangai (North Khangai) and Ovorkhangai (South Khangai). The mild climate area where the two provinces meet (in eastern Khangai) is known as the cradle of Mongolian and nomadic civilization. The plains at the foot of the eastern Khangai host the Orkhon Valley World Heritage Site. The Xiongnu capital Luut Khot (Lungcheng), the Xianbei capital Ordo and the Rouran capital Moomt (Mume) are said to have been located there. Later empires also established their capitals there: e.g. the Uyghur Khaganate (745–840) built their capital Ordu-Baliq in the region.

Features

The tallest mountain is Otgontenger ( "Youngest sky"), which is about 4,000 metres tall. It is revered by the Mongols and state ceremonies are held there.

Suvraga Khairkhan, 3,117 metres tall, is another sacred mountain to the east of Tsetserleg.

Taryatu-Chulutu is an extinct volcanic field on the northern slopes of the Khangai Mountains.

The mountains feed the rivers Orkhon, Selenge, Ider, Zavkhan and the lakes Orog and Böön tsagaan. In the west, the Khangai mountains transition into the Great Lakes Depression.

The Khangai mountain region is known for its mild microclimates in certain areas. Winters there are not as harsh as in other parts of the country.

References

Mountain ranges of Mongolia